The 1951 European Judo Championships were the 1st edition of the European Judo Championships, and were held in Paris, France, on 5  December 1951.

Medal winners

References

External links
 

E
European Judo Championships
European Judo Championships
European Judo Championships
Europe
Sport in Paris
International sports competitions hosted by France